Erke is a musical instrument from the Gran Chaco of Bolivia, northern Chile

ERKE is a sportswear brand from China.

Erke or ERKE  may also refer to:

People
 Derya Erke (born 1983), Turkish swimmer
 Elisabeth Erke (born 1962), Norwegian Sami educator and politician
 Jason Erkes (born 1969), American journalist, media strategist and entrepreneur

Places
 Erke-Kashka, village in Aravan District, Osh Region of Kyrgyzstan